St John the Baptist Church is a Roman Catholic Parish church in Rochdale, Greater Manchester, England. It was founded in 1830, and built in 1927. It is situated on the corner of Maclure Road and Dowling Street, opposite the Greater Manchester Fire Service Museum in the centre of the town. It was built in the Byzantine Revival style and is a Grade II* listed building.

History

Foundation
From 1824, a Catholic priest resided in Rochdale. He was Fr William Turner, who later became Bishop of Salford. Originally, Mass was said in a room of a warehouse on Clegg Street. In 1829, St John's Church church was built and opened on Ann Street in Rochdale. Fr Turner was priest until 1835, when he became the priest at St Chad's Church in Cheetham Hill. He was replaced by a Fr Dowling. In 1860, this church was replaced by one made of brick. In 1871, Fr Dowling died and was replaced by a dean, Fr O'Neill. In the late 1800s, as the towns were increasing in population, further Catholic missions were started in the surrounding area. From 1898 to 1937, the priest at St John the Baptist Church was Canon Henry Chipp.

Construction

Canon Chipp sought the construction of a new, larger church to replace the one made of brick. He wanted a church to resemble the Hagia Sophia in Istanbul. The architect of St John the Baptist Church was Henry Oswald Hill. He was the cousin of Charles Joseph Gadd the Vicar General of the diocese. The design of the church was influenced by Westminster Cathedral and John Francis Bentley. On 21 October 1917, after making the designs for the church, Hill was killed in action during World War I flying as a captain in the Royal Flying Corp, serving in what later became No. 52 Squadron RAF. He also designed St Teresa's Church in Irlam in 1900, St Brigid's Church in Bradford in 1901, St Alphonsus in Old Trafford in 1903, Our Lady and the English Martyrs Church in Urmston in 1911, and St Joseph's Church in Heywood in 1913.

In 1918, Henry Thomas Sandy bought Hill's architectural firm. In 1920, Ernest Bower Norris joined the practice. In 1922, Sandy died and Norris ran the firm, which became known as Hill, Sandy & Norris, which ceased operations in 1969. St John's Church was the first time Norris had built a Byzantine-style church. From 1962 to 1964, he designed a similar church, St John Fisher Church, in West Heath, West Midlands.

The church was built from 1925 to 1927. The original design for the church had a bell tower, which was never built. From 1930 to 1933, the mosaic in the sanctuary was made. The theme of the mosaic is eternal life. It was designed by Eric Newton of Ludwig Oppenheimer Ltd, cost £4000 and was made by craftspeople in Manchester.

In 1966, a presbytery was built, attached to the north side of the church. The architects for it were Desmond Williams & Associates. In 1998, a residence was added to the side of the church. This was done by demolishing the presbytery and a section of the east transept.

Parish

St John the Baptist Church together with St Gabriel and the Angels Church in Castleton, Greater Manchester, are part of the same parish called the Parish of St Gabriel and the Angels and St John the Baptist. In 1879, St Gabriel and the Angels Church started as a mission from St John the Baptist Church. In 1884, a building housing a chapel and school was built. In 1894, a presbytery was added. In 1951, with the increasing Catholic congregation in the area, the former Princess Cinema in Smalley Street (built in 1900) was bought and adapted to replace the old chapel and became the present St Gabriel and the Angels Church.

St John the Baptist Church has a Sunday Mass at 9:30am. St Gabriel and the Angels Church has one Sunday Mass at 11:00am.

See also

 Roman Catholic Diocese of Salford
 Grade II* listed buildings in Greater Manchester
 Listed buildings in Rochdale

References

External links

 St John the Baptist Church site
 St Gabriel and the Angels Church site

Roman Catholic churches in Greater Manchester
Saint John
Grade II listed Roman Catholic churches in England
Byzantine Revival architecture in the United Kingdom
1830 establishments in England
Roman Catholic churches completed in 1927
Roman Catholic Diocese of Salford
20th-century Roman Catholic church buildings in the United Kingdom